Rosetta Allan is a New Zealand poet and novelist.

Career
Allan's first collection of poems, Little Rock, was published in 2007. Her second, Over Lunch, was published in 2010. 

In 2012, Allan began researching the history of European settlement in New Zealand in order to further understand her own family tree. In doing so, she came across material regarding a man named John Finnigan, who was apparently murdered in 1865 along with his mother and two brothers. The incident was referred to as the Otahuhu Murders, and formed the focal point for her novel, Purgatory, which was published in New Zealand in 2014.

Allan has held a number of writing residencies. In April 2016, she was appointed Writer-in-Residence at St Petersburg University in Russia. In 2018, Allan was appointed Writer-in-Residence at the Michael King Writer's Centre. In 2019, Allan was appointed Creative New Zealand University of Waikato Writer in Residence in Hamilton for the year.

Publications 
Allan's publications are:
Little Rock (2007)
Over Lunch (2010)
Purgatory (2014)
The Unreliable People (2019)
Crazy Love (2021)

Awards 
 Kathleen Grattan Prize for a Sequence of Poems, 2010
 The Metonymy Best Poem Award (2010)

References

External links
Allan, Rosetta, profile on Read NZ Te Pou Muramura

Living people
New Zealand women poets
21st-century New Zealand poets
21st-century New Zealand women writers
Year of birth missing (living people)